Major-General Abdullah Saeed was a Pakistani general who served as Commandant of the Pakistan Military Academy at Kakul,  Chief Martial Law Administrator for Baluchistan when Zia overthrew Bhutto and later Pakistan's ambassador to Mexico, Costa Rica, Panama, Venezuela and Cuba under Zia-ul-Haq.

Early career
Saeed started his career in 6 Frontier Force (FF) Regiment after he graduated the Pakistan Military Academy (PMA) course in 1948.

Personal life
He was born in Abottabad in the northern Hazara region of the Khyber Pakhtunkhwa province. He was the son of Lahore Ahmadiyya Movement Emir Dr. Saeed Ahmad Khan and died in 1988 of colon cancer. Zia-ul-Haq personally went and offered condolences to his family in Lahore.

References

Pakistani generals
Ambassadors of Pakistan to Cuba
Ambassadors of Pakistan to Mexico
1988 deaths
Year of birth missing
Date of birth missing
Place of birth missing
Date of death missing
Place of death missing
People from Abbottabad
Deaths from colorectal cancer
Pakistani Ahmadis
Deaths from cancer in Pakistan